The American Adoption Congress (AAC) was created in the late 1970s as an umbrella organization by the search and support, adoption reform groups sprouting up across the United States, Canada and around the world. Initiated by Orphan Voyage founder, Jean Paton, people representing many groups gathered in regions around the US and began planning the incorporation. The first AAC Conference was held in Washington, DC in May 1979. The second was in Anaheim, CA in 1980, and the third at the TWA Training facility outside Kansas City in 1981, where it was reincorporated and gained 501(c)3 tax exempt status. Conferences have been held around the United States annually ever since.

The American Adoption Congress is composed of individuals, families and organizations committed to adoption reform. They represent persons whose lives are touched by adoption or other loss of family continuity. AAC promotes honesty, openness and respect for family connections in adoption, foster care and assisted reproduction. They provide education to members and professional communities about the lifelong process of adoption.  AAC also advocates legislation that will grant every individual access to information about his or her family and heritage.

Conference History

References 

Adoption-related organizations